Orley Farm may refer to:

The book Orley Farm by Anthony Trollope
Orley Farm School, in Harrow, in London